The Hopar Valley (Urdu: وادی ہوپر) is a scenic portion of the Nagar Valley in Gilgit-Baltistan, in Pakistan.  It is about 10 km away from Nagar Khas, the principal city of the Nagar Valley.  Hopar Valley is home of the Spantik and Hopar (Hopper) glaciers.

Geographical features

Hopar Valley is a cluster of villages around a natural bowl at a bend of Baltoro Glacier.  Opposite to Hopar the white Bualtar is joined by the Barpu Glacier.  This is a base camp for treks into the high, glacier-draped peaks called the Hispar Muztagh.  Whole population of this valley is Burushaski speakers.

The valley has a number of natural formations, including glaciers, lakes, and high mountains.

Glaciers 

There are three glaciers in the valley:
 Hoper glacier
 Barpu glacier
 Miar glacier
Daranci glacier
Geentur or Supulter glacier

Lakes 

'Rush Lake Hoper' is the most visited tourist destination in the valley. Rush Lake Hoper is situated in Nagar District Gilgit Baltistan, Pakistan. It is located at the middle of Rush Peak, at over 4,694 meters. Rush Lake is one of the highest alpine lakes in the world. It is 2nd highest elevated lake in South Asia. In the surrounding area are green pastures - which support local domesticated and wild animals. This includes local animals like goats, yaks and sheep, and wild animals like Himalayan ibex, retch, fox and snow leopard. The Pakistan National Bird, chakour, is also found.

Mountains 

The valley is home to many high mountains such as Golden peak or Spantik (7027 m), Bawalter peak (from where Hoper glacier starts), Rush Peak and Miar peak (7257 m) while the other series of mountains view from Rush peak like K2, Passu Peak, Diran Peak, and Rakaposhi.

Seasons 

The spring season starts from April and ends by June, July to September there is summer and autumn arrives in October and from November to March it is winter time and during this period there is huge snowfall.

See also
 Biafo Glacier
 Diran
 Hispar Valley
 Nagar Valley
 Rakaposhi
 Rush Lake
 Spantik
 State of Nagar

References

Valleys of Gilgit-Baltistan